Denis Platonov (born November 6, 1981) is a Russian former professional ice hockey centre who most notably played for Metallurg Magnitogorsk of the Kontinental Hockey League (KHL). He was selected by the Nashville Predators in the 3rd round (75th overall) of the 2001 NHL Entry Draft.

Following the completion of the 2018–19 season with Metallurg Magnitogorsk, limited to just 24 games through injury, Platonov ended his 21-year professional career, with an interest to pursue coaching.

Awards and honors

Career statistics

References

External links

1981 births
Living people
Ak Bars Kazan players
Avangard Omsk players
Metallurg Magnitogorsk players
Milwaukee Admirals players
Nashville Predators draft picks
HC Neftekhimik Nizhnekamsk players
Salavat Yulaev Ufa players
Russian ice hockey centres